Luis Silveira (born 16 January 1971) is a former Uruguayan professional basketball player.

Professional career
Silveira was the Uruguayan League MVP, and Uruguayan League Finals MVP, in 2005.

References

1971 births
Living people
Basketball players at the 1995 Pan American Games
Basketball players at the 1999 Pan American Games
Pan American Games competitors for Uruguay
Uruguayan men's basketball players